Mobarak Al-Faneeni (born on 21 January 2000), is a Kuwaiti professional football player who plays for  the Kuwaiti national team.

On 14 November 2019, Al-Faneeni scored his first goal for Kuwait at the 2022 FIFA World Cup qualification against Chinese Taipei in a 9–0 victory.

International goals
Scores and results list Kuwait's goal tally first.

References

2000 births
Living people
Kuwaiti footballers
Kuwait international footballers
Al Salmiya SC players
Association football forwards
Kuwait Premier League players